Phorinothrips is a genus of thrips in the family Phlaeothripidae.

Species
 Phorinothrips levis
 Phorinothrips loranthi
 Phorinothrips minusculus

References

Phlaeothripidae
Thrips
Thrips genera